Bletchingley Castle is a ruined castle and set of earthworks partly occupied by three buildings.  The Scheduled Ancient Monument is directly beside the Greensand Way below it to the south in the village of Bletchingley in Surrey.  The site's tower standing from c.1170 to 1264 had a panorama from one of the narrower parts of the Greensand Ridge, which runs from mid-Kent to south-west Surrey.

History
Late in the 12th century a rectangular tower was built on an earlier enclosure of earthworks by Richard Fitz Gilbert, founder of the de Clare family.   In 1170 on the way to Canterbury the four knights responsible for assassinating Thomas Becket stopped here.  Such a tower would have provided a complete look-out from the Greensand Ridge, which itself provided a relatively reliably dry but not foot or hoof-wearing east-west route.

In the 1260s the castle was besieged and taken by royal forces.  The tower was destroyed.

The remains of the masonry defences point to mid-12th-century work and indicate a masonry castle of the time of King Stephen, a period during which many such strongholds were erected. The Surrey branch of the medieval noble Clare family lived in the village and sided with the barons during the disputes with the Crown in the 13th century, and in the wars of 1263–4 it was, so far as is recorded, for the first and only time was the scene of military operations. Simon de Montfort, accompanied by Gilbert de Clare, 7th Earl of Gloucester, marched by here on his way to attack the king's army on the coast. Although the barons won a victory at Lewes, the Royalists having seized de Clare's family Tonbridge Castle pounced upon his London force who had been driven from the field and were retreating the way they had come, and are said to have taken and dismantled Blechingley Castle, an operation which might have been disastrous for the barons had they been beaten at Lewes. H. E. Malden states with citations: "it is probable, however, that the castle was not totally destroyed by this comparatively small force, but that, having once been dismantled, it fell into neglect and became gradually ruined. John Aubrey, writing about 1697, mentions 'one piece of wall of 5 foot thick' as still remaining. Manning, in the early 19th century, says the foundations were still visible."

Owners
The land on which the castle had stood became separated from the manor (to the north), and appears to have been held in the 16th century by a Cholmeley, who also held land called Unwins (a name seen in certain later place names in the parish), which lay close by the site below the hill. According to Manning the site afterwards belonged to a Drake family, who assumed the name of Brockman in the late 18th century. In 1793 James Drake Brockman sold it to John Kenrick, whose brothers, Matthew and Jarvis, afterwards held in turn. It belonged to this family when Edward Wedlake Brayley wrote about the county.  After Mr. James Norris, who built Castle Hill about 1860 it belonged to a Mr. Partridge.

The castle as such became part of the grounds of the house Castle Hill — it was home of Mr. A. P. Brandt in 1911.

Ruins
The site has been quite overgrown for many years but vegetation does not cover part of the minority of materials that remain, as walls, doorways and arches.

Specifically, one outer ditch has been partially infilled and the site has been indented by foundation-laying, associated water pipes, drain, electricity cable and access road for the 19th century construction of the Castle Hill home and now separately owned Stable House and Garden Cottage near the centre of the large mound, its ringwork and bailey (fortification) at Bletchingley survives well and "large areas, especially within the ringwork, lie apparently undisturbed". The survival of part of a Norman domestic building is a rarity and one which adds to the castle's broad diversity of features. The potential of the monument for the recovery of further evidence of the date and manner of occupation of the castle is high. As a result of the small-scale excavations, archaeological documentation has been compiled.

An extract from the schedule monument determination is:

Towards the north-west is a small mound which may mark the site of a barbican.

Notes and references
Notes 
  
References

Further reading

Castles in Surrey
Ruins in Surrey
Ruined castles in England